The list of provincial parks in the Canadian province of Ontario contains lists of more than 300 provincial parks in Ontario. These provincial parks are maintained by Ontario Parks. For a list of protected areas in Ontario, see the List of protected areas of Ontario.

Northern Ontario
List of provincial parks of Northern Ontario
Southern Ontario
List of provincial parks of Central Ontario
List of provincial parks of Eastern Ontario
List of provincial parks of Southwestern Ontario
List of provincial parks of the Golden Horseshoe

External links 
Ontario Parks map

Ontario
Provincial parks
Provincial parks in Canada